The action off Bastia (French: bataille navale de Pietracorbara) was a naval battle fought on 9 September 1943 off Corsica principal port Bastia in Tyrrhenian Sea, part of the Mediterranean Sea. It was one of the few successful Italian reactions to Operation Achse, and one of the first acts of resistance by the Italian armed forces against Nazi Germany after the armistice of Cassibile.

Background
The  Cormorano was on watch off Bastia.

The local Italian and German commanders soon reached a "gentlemen’s agreement" according to which the German forces would be allowed to safely retreat to mainland Italy.
Meanwhile, however, the German forces secretly prepared to launch a surprise attack on the Italian ships moored inside the harbour, planning to capture them. The attack started at 23:45 on 8 September, when two groups of German soldiers, after hearing a whistle (the signal to attack), stormed Ardito; the torpedo boat was heavily damaged (70 of her 180 crew were killed) and captured, and the merchant ships Sassari and Humanitas also fell into German hands. On board Humanitas, German gunners manning the anti-aircraft guns turned their weapons on the Italian crew and soldiers aboard, and the Italian lookouts were stabbed or killed with hand grenades.

Action
Aliseo had just left the harbour when the German attack began.
Shortly after dawn on 9 September, a combat group of the Tenth Bersaglieri Group (10° Raggruppamento Celere Bersaglieri) staged a counterattack which led to the recapture of the port. Ardito, Sassari and Humanitas were also recaptured. The German flotilla was ordered to leave the harbour, but as soon as they left, the ships were shelled by the Italian coastal batteries (armed with 76 mm guns), which damaged UJ 2203 and some of the MFPs.

Aliseo (under the command of commander Carlo Fecia di Cossato) was then ordered by the port commander to attack and destroy the German units. At 8:20 UJ 2203, after suffering several hits, blew up; ten minutes later UJ 2219 was also destroyed when her magazines exploded. Between 8:30 and 8:35 Aliseo also sank F 366, F 459 and F 623; Cormorano intervened during the final phase of the battle and, together with Aliseo, forced F 387 and F 612 to run aground, after which they were abandoned and destroyed. Cormorano also sank the 43-ton Luftwaffe service motorboat FL B. 412.

Twenty-five German survivors were picked up by Aliseo, which then (along with the damaged Ardito) proceeded towards Portoferraio, as ordered. The damage suffered by Ardito later caused this ship to be left behind in Portoferraio, where she was eventually captured by German forces.

References

Bibliography 
 

Naval battles of World War II involving Germany
Naval battles of World War II involving Italy
Conflicts in 1943
Italian naval victories in the battle of the Mediterranean
History of Corsica
Italian resistance movement
September 1943 events
Maritime incidents in France